Amos Yong (born July 26, 1965) is a Malaysian-American Pentecostal theologian and Professor of Theology and Mission at Fuller Theological Seminary. He has been Dean of School of Theology and School of Intercultural Studies at Fuller Seminary, since July 1, 2019.

Biography 
A licensed minister in the Assemblies of God,  Yong was born in Malaysia and immigrated to the United States. His Ph.D. from Boston University is in religion and theology, and he has a B.A. from Bethany College, an M.A. from Western Evangelical Seminary, and an M.A. from Portland State University.  He was the J. Rodman Williams Professor of Theology and Dean at Regent University School of Divinity (Virginia Beach, VA) until June 2014. Since July 1, 2014, Yong has been Professor of Theology & Mission at Fuller Theological Seminary and director of the Fuller Theological Seminary's Center for Missiological Research. He was Dean of School of Theology and School of Intercultural Studies at Fuller Seminary, effective July 1, 2019.

He is a former president of the Society for Pentecostal Studies (2008 – 09) and co-edited its journal, PNEUMA from 2011 – 2014.  He was the founding co-chair for the Pentecostal-Charismatic Movements Group for the American Academy of hope and Religion (2006 – 2011) and is co-editor of five monograph series: Pentecostal Manifestos (Eerdmans), Studies in Religion, Theology and Disability (Baylor), CHARIS: Christianity & Renewal – Interdisciplinary Studies (Palgrave Macmillan), Missiological Engagements (IVP Academic), and Mission in Global Community (Baker Academic). 

In the last decade, he has become one of the most prolific writers among Pentecostal theologians in the academy. As of 2012, he has devoted scholarly monographs to interreligious dialogue and comparative theology, global Pentecostal theology, theology of disability, political theology, dialogue between science and religion, and theology of love. What may be his most important book (Spirit-Word-Community) is an articulation of a trinitarian theological method and hermeneutic that provides the conceptual basis for all his other work. In it he demonstrates his ability to bring a Pentecostal account of pneumatology to bear on a number of perennial theological and philosophical concerns, and thus shows that he is not interested only in parochial Pentecostal issues.


Amos came to Fuller Theological Seminary in 2014 as a professor for missions and was named the Dean for the School of Intercultural Studies in 2019.

Partial bibliography

Books
 Discerning the Spirit(s): A Pentecostal-Charismatic Contribution to Christian Theology of Religions (2000) 
 Spirit-Word-Community: Theological Hermeneutics in Trinitarian Perspective (2002) 
 Beyond the Impasse: Toward a Pneumatological Theology of Religions (2003) 
 The Spirit Poured Out on All Flesh: Pentecostalism and the Possibility of Global Theology (2005) 
 Theology and Down Syndrome: Reimagining Disability in Late Modernity (2007)  
 Hospitality and the Other: Pentecost, Christian Practices, and the Neighbor (2008)  
 In the Days of Caesar: Pentecostalism and Political Theology - The Cadbury Lectures 2009 (2010)  
 The Bible, Disability, and the Church: A New Vision of the People of God (2011)  
 The Spirit of Creation: Modern Science and Divine Action in the Pentecostal-Charismatic Imagination (2011)  
 Who is the Holy Spirit?: A Walk with the Apostles (2011)  
 Afro-Pentecostalism: Black Pentecostal and Charismatic Christianity in History and Culture (2011) 
 The Cosmic Breath: Spirit and Nature in the Christian-Buddhism-Science Trialogue (2012)  
 Pneumatology and the Christian-Buddhist Dialogue, Does the Spirit Blow through the Middle Way? (2012)  
 Spirit of Love: A Trinitarian Theology of Grace (2012) 
 Renewing Christian Theology: Systematics for a Global Christianity (2014) 
 The Future of Evangelical Theology: Soundings from the Asian American Diaspora (InterVarsity Press, 2014) 
 Mission After Pentecost: The Witness of the Spirit from Genesis to Revelation (Baker Academic, 2019)
 Renewing the Church by the Spirit: Theological Education after Pentecost (Eerdmans, 2020)

Articles

 "Many Tongues, Many Senses: Pentecost, the Body Politic, and the Redemption of Dis/ability.” Pneuma 31, 2 (2009): 167-188.
 (with Dale M. Coulter) "From West to East: The Renewal of the Leading Journal in Pentecostal Studies.” Pneuma 10, 2 (2011): 147-173.
 "Sons and Daughters, Young and Old: Toward a Pentecostal Theology of the Family.” PentecoStudies 10, 2 (2011): 147-173.
 "Science and Religion: Introducing the Issues, Entering the Debates--A Review Essay.” Christian Scholar's Review 40, 2 (Winter 2011): 189-203.
 "Reading Scripture and Nature: Pentecostal Hermeneutics and Their Implications for the Contemporary Evangelical Theology and Science Conversation.” Perspectives on Science and Christian Faith 63, 1 (March 2011): 3-15.
 "Disability and the Love of Wisdom: De-Forming, Re-Forming, and Per-Forming Philosophy of Religion.” Evangelical Review of Theology 35, 2 (April 2011): 160-176.
 "The Spirit of Science: Are Pentecostals Ready to Engage the Discussion?" Cyberjournal for Pentecostal-Charismatic Research (April 20, 2011). 
 "Disability Theology of the Resurrection: Persisting Questions and Additional Considerations--A Response to Ryan Mullins.” Ars Disputandi 12 (2012).
 "Pentecostal Scholarship and Scholarship on Pentecostalism: The Next Generation.” Pneuma 34, 2 (2012): 161-165.
 "What's Love Got to Do With It?: The Sociology of Godly Love and the Renewal of Modern Pentecostalism.” Journal of Pentecostal Theology 21, 1 (2012): 113-134.
 "Informality, Illegality, and Improvisation: Theological Reflections on Money, Migration, and Ministry in Chinatown, NYC, and Beyond.” Journal of Race, Ethnicity, and Religion 3, 2 (January 2012).
 "Sanctification, Science, and the Spirit: Salvaging Holiness in the Late Modern World.” Wesleyan Theological Journal 47, 2 (Fall 2012): 36-52.

Chapters
 "The Buddhist-Christian Encounter in the United States: Reflections on Christian Practices." In Ecumenical Directions in the United States Today: Churches on a Theological Journey, eds. Antonios Kireopoulos and Juliana Mecera. New York: Paulist Press, 2011.
 "The Spirit, Vocation, and the Life of the Mind: A Pentecostal Testimony." In Pentecostals in the Academy: Testimonies of Call, eds. Steven M. Fettke and Robby Waddell. Cleveland: CPT Press, 2012.
 "Relational Theology and the Holy Spirit." In Relational Theology: A Contemporary Introduction, eds. Brint Montgomery, Thomas J. Oord, and Karen Strand Winslow. Eugene: Wipf & Stock, 2012.
 "Pentecostal and Charismatic Theology." In The Routledge Companion to Modern Christian Thought, eds. James Beilby and Chad Meister. New York: Routledge, 2013.

References

External links
 Faculty Page: Fuller Theological Seminary, Director of the Center for Missiological Research (CMR) and Professor of Theology and Mission
 "Who and What is the Holy Spirit?" Interview with Amos Yong on The Laymens Lounge.

1965 births
Academic journal editors
American theologians
American people of Chinese descent
American people of Malaysian descent
Boston University School of Theology alumni
Living people
Malaysian people of Hakka descent
Portland State University alumni
Regent University faculty
World Christianity scholars